Upright may refer to:

 Body relative direction, the geometrical orientation of a person etc. 
 Upright (TV series), Australian drama
 Upright Technologies, produces devices for improving posture
 Uprights, the vertical posts of the goal structure used in various sports
 Steering knuckle, an automotive suspension and steering part